The swimming events of the 15th FINA World Aquatics Championships were held July 28 – August 4, 2013, in Barcelona, Spain. The competition was held in a long course pool inside the Palau Sant Jordi. It featured 40 LCM events, split evenly between males and females. Swimming was one of the five aquatic disciplines at the championships.

The United States won the overall medal count, led by Missy Franklin who claimed a record-setting six gold medals. China's  Sun Yang won three gold medals en route to "male swimmer of the meet". Katie Ledecky, from the United States, was named "female swimmer of the meet" after setting two world records and winning four gold medals. Four other women's world records were broken during the competition, all four in the women's breaststroke events.

Qualifying criteria
If a nation entered one competitor in an event then they only have to meet the B standard, but if they enter two competitors then in an event then they both have to meet the A standard. Each member nation can enter one relay team in each event. Qualifying standards must have been met between July 1, 2012, and July 1, 2013.

Competition format:
events 200 meters and under: preliminaries-semifinals-finals (top 16 finishers from prelims advanced to semifinals; top-8 in the semifinals advanced to the final).
events 400 meters and longer: prelims/final (top 8 finishers from prelims advanced to the final).

Schedule

Recap
During the World Aquatic Championships, five world records were set (one twice), all by women. Katie Ledecky of the United States broke the world record in the 800-metre freestyle and the 1500-metre freestyle events en route to two gold medals. She also won the 400-metre freestyle to go 3-for-3 in her events. She added a fourth gold, swimming a leg of the 4x200-metre freestyle relay that the United States won. Her performance earned her "female swimmer of the meet," beating out fellow American Missy Franklin based on a formula that does not consider relay events. Franklin became the first woman ever to win six golds in a single World Championships. Kristin Otto of East Germany has achieved this at the 1988 Olympic Games. She won the 100-metre and 200-metre backstroke events and the 200-metre freestyle. She finished fourth in the 100-metre freestyle in personal best-time. She was also a part of all three women's relay events, which the United States swept. The previous record of five golds in a single World Championships was held by America's Tracy Caulkins and Australia's Libby Trickett. Among men, Michael Phelps and Mark Spitz of America, Ian Thorpe of Australia all won at least six golds in a single World Championships or Olympics. Franklin also moved into a tie with Trickett for most all-time gold medals with nine.

Rūta Meilutytė of Lithuania broke both the 50-metre and 100-metre breaststroke records in the semi-final of each event. Denmark's Rikke Møller Pedersen set the 200-metre breatstroke record in that event's semi-finals. However, it was Russia's  Yuliya Yefimova who won the gold medal in both the 50-metre and 200-metre events, while Meilutytė took gold in the 100-metre.

On the men's side, Sun Yang claimed three golds by winning the 400-metre, 800-metre, and 1500-metre freestyle events to earn "male swimmer of the meet." He also swam China to bronze in the 4x200-metre freestyle relay despite starting his anchor leg two seconds behind third place.  Ryan Lochte from the United States won two gold to bring his overall World Champions haul to 15. In the 4x100-metre medley relay, the United States appeared to finish first by a wide margin but was disqualified because a swimmer left the platform too early. As a result, France moved up to first.  Camille Lacourt won France's first ever 50-metre backstroke title. César Cielo became the first three-time World Champion of the 50-metre free, winning a final that featured three Olympic gold medalists.

Medal summary
The United States won the overall medal count with 29 medals (24% of total available) and 13 golds (32%). China won the second most golds (5), but just 9 medals overall (down from 14 in the last World Championships). Australia won 13 medals (3 gold) for second place on the total medal count. Russia won 8 medals, the most for the nation since 1998. Germany, Great Britain, and Italy, all historically strong swimming nations, won just four medals among them.

Medal table

 Host nation

Men

Women

Records
The following world and championship records were broken during the competition.

World records

Championship records

Legend: † – en route to final mark

References

 
2013 World Aquatics Championships
World Championships
Swimming at the World Aquatics Championships
International aquatics competitions hosted by Spain